120 Paintings from the Rijksmuseum is a selection of paintings that were included in a booklet of illustrations in the Rijksmuseum Amsterdam giftshop for visitors during the years 1950–1990. It was meant as an illustrated companion guide to the catalog of the paintings on show, which included information about the +/-1,200 paintings on show.				
The painting River Landscape with Ferry by Salomon van Ruysdael was part of the collection of Jacques Goudstikker and was restituted to his heir in 2006. It is now in the collection of the National Gallery of Art. Various other paintings were on long-term loan from the Amsterdam Museum and have been returned, but the majority are all still in the collection of the Rijksmuseum today. Some of the paintings have been reattributed to other artists since 1956. No works by women artists were included in the selection.

List of Illustrations

Foreign Schools

References

 Rijksmuseum				
 Album: 120 (Tableaux du) / (Schilderijen uit het) / Paintings from the Rijksmuseum, Opening hours and table of titles of 120 black & white illustrations of paintings in English, Dutch, and French, paperback tourist guide c. 1950–1990, Rijksmuseum Amsterdam, undated, but copies can be dated based on the selection

Rijksmuseum Amsterdam
Lists of paintings